Jim Tucker may refer to:

 Jim Tucker (basketball) (born 1932), former professional basketball player
 Jim Tucker (journalist) (1934–2013), journalist focused on the Bilderberg Group
 Jim B. Tucker American psychiatrist, and reincarnation researcher
 Jim Guy Tucker (born 1943), Arkansas political figure
 Jim Tucker (Louisiana politician) (born 1964), former speaker of the Louisiana House of Representatives

 Jim Tucker, co-pilot of FedEx flight 705.

See also
 James Tucker (disambiguation)